Gary Nagle (born 1975) is a South African business executive, and the CEO of Glencore.

Nagle earned degrees in commerce and accounting from the University of the Witwatersrand, South Africa. He qualified as a chartered accountant in South Africa in 1999.

Nagle joined Glencore in 2000, rising to head up its coal assets, and succeeded Ivan Glasenberg as CEO on July 1, 2021.

He planned to relocate from Australia to Switzerland in 2021.

References

Living people
South African commodities traders
Glencore people
Businesspeople in metals
University of the Witwatersrand alumni
South African accountants
White South African people
1970s births